Bickford is a village in England.

Bickford may also refer to:

People
Bickford (surname)
William Bickford Row (1786-1865), Newfoundland merchant, lawyer and politician
 Zahr Myron Bickford (1876-1961), Mandolin virtuoso, author of Bickford Mandolin Method and Bickford Banjo Method

Other uses
Bickford, Ontario, a community of the township of St. Clair
Ensign-Bickford Company in Simsbury, Connecticut
The Amazing Mr. Bickford, a Frank Zappa video featuring Claymation
The Education of Max Bickford, a television series
Bickford Shmeckler's Cool Ideas, a 2006 film

See also
Bickford's (disambiguation)